is a 1979 Japanese film directed by Tetsutaro Murano. It was Japan's submission to the 52nd Academy Awards for the Academy Award for Best Foreign Language Film, but was not accepted as a nominee.

Cast
 Hisashi Igawa as Iwazo
 Yūko Katagiri as Kayo
 Atsuko Kawaguchi as Wife
 Chōichirō Kawarazaki as Karasu
 Kin Sugai as Kane
 Chikako Yuri as Fumiko
 Yūsuke Takita as Tasuke

See also
List of Japanese submissions for the Academy Award for Best Foreign Language Film

References

External links

1970s Japanese-language films
1979 films
1970s Japanese films